Malyshevo is a rural locality (a selo) and the administrative center of Malyshevskoye Rural Settlement, Selivanovsky District, Vladimir Oblast, Russia. The population was 799 as of 2010. There are 9 streets.

Geography 
Malyshevo is located 26 km southwest of Krasnaya Gorbatka (the district's administrative centre) by road. Mitrofanovo is the nearest rural locality.

References 

Rural localities in Selivanovsky District